SWG may refer to:
IBM Software Group, an internal division of IBM
Scientific Working Group, an organisational structure for US forensic scientists
Screen Writers Guild, a former writers union
Secure Web Gateway, a product providing threat protection and content filtering for internet access
Sleeping With Ghosts, a 2003 album by UK band Placebo
Society of Woman Geographers, a professional association for researchers, scientists, explorers, and others in geographic-related fields.
Standard wire gauge, a measurement for wires and sheet material
Star Wars Galaxies, a 2003 computer game by LucasArts
Strain Wave Gearing, a type of mechanical gear system that uses a flexible spline with external teeth, to form a compact, high gear ratio mechanism.
Swabian German (ISO 639-3 language code)
SWG, a chlorine generator used in salt water chlorination, a way of sanitizing swimming pools by separating the chlorine ions (Cl-) from salt (NaCl)
ICAO code for Sunwing Airlines
 Special Warfare Group (Singapore), Singapore police